Tianjinbinguan station, is an interchange station between Line 5 and Line 6 of Tianjin Metro in Tianjin, China, which opened in 2018.

Station structure
A cross-platform interchange is provided between Line 5 and Line 6.

Platform layout
Island Platform on B2

Island Platform on B3

References

Railway stations in Tianjin
Railway stations in China opened in 2018
Tianjin Metro stations